The 1st Filipino Academy of Movie Arts and Sciences Awards Night was held on July 16, 1953, in Hotel Riviera Mansion, Dewey Boulevard (now Roxas Boulevard) honoring the best achievements of Filipino films in 1952. Sawa sa Lumang Simboryo produced by Manuel Vistan Jr. is the first recipient of FAMAS Award for Best Picture.

Awards
Winners are listed first and highlighted with boldface.

References

External links

FAMAS Awards 

FAMAS Award
FAMAS
FAMAS